Jaqueline Fleming (born September 10, 1977) is an American-Danish actress. Fleming has appeared in Enemies Among Us, Red, Contraband, Bering Sea Beast, Queen of the South and Abraham Lincoln: Vampire Hunter.

Fleming is also the first acting coach of actor Jason Mitchell.

Filmography

Film

Television

References

External links
 

1977 births
African-American actresses
American film actresses
American television actresses
Living people
Actresses from Copenhagen
Danish emigrants to the United States
21st-century American women